Jennifer Yu may refer to:

Jennifer Yu (actress) (born 1993), Hong Kong actress
Jennifer Yu (chess player) (born 2002), American chess player
Jennifer Yu Cheng (born 1981), Hong Kong business-woman